This is a list of current and former Roman Catholic churches in the Roman Catholic Diocese of Providence. The diocese covers all five counties in Rhode Island. The cathedral church of the archdiocese is the Cathedral of Saints Peter and Paul, built from 1878 to 1889 in Providence.

Providence County

Providence

Burrillville

Central Falls

Cranston

Cumberland

East Providence

Johnston

Lincoln

North Providence

Pawtucket

Smithfield

Woonsocket

Other

Bristol County

Barrington

Bristol

Warren

Kent County

Coventry

East Greenwich

Warwick

West Warwick

Newport County

Newport

Portsmouth

Tiverton

Other

Washington County

Kingstown (North and South)

Narragansett

Westerly

Other

References

 
Providence